A parliamentary republic is a republic that operates under a parliamentary system of government where the executive branch (the government) derives its legitimacy from and is accountable to the legislature (the parliament). There are a number of variations of parliamentary republics. Most have a clear differentiation between the head of government and the head of state, with the head of government holding real power, such as in constitutional monarchies. However, in some countries the head of state has 'reserve powers' to use at their discretion as a non-partisan 'referee' of the political process. Some have combined the roles of head of state and head of government, much like presidential systems, but with a dependency upon parliamentary power.

Powers 

In contrast to republics operating under either the presidential system or the semi-presidential system, the head of state usually does not have executive powers as an executive president would (some may have 'reserve powers' or a bit more influence beyond that), because many of those powers have been granted to a head of government (usually called a prime minister).

However, in a parliamentary republic with a head of state whose tenure is dependent on parliament, the head of government and head of state can form one office (as in Botswana, the Marshall Islands, Nauru, and South Africa), but the president is still selected in much the same way as the prime minister is in most Westminster systems. This usually means that they are the leader of the largest party or coalition of parties in parliament.

In some cases, the president can legally have executive powers granted to them to undertake the day-to-day running of government (as in Austria and Iceland) but by convention they either do not use these powers or they use them only to give effect to the advice of the parliament or head of government. Some parliamentary republics could therefore be seen as following the semi-presidential system but operating under a parliamentary system.

Historical development 
Typically, parliamentary republics are states that were previously constitutional monarchies with a parliamentary system.

Following the defeat of Napoleon III in the Franco-Prussian War, France once again became a republic – the French Third Republic – in 1870. The President of the Third Republic had significantly less executive powers than those of the previous two republics had. The Third Republic lasted until the invasion of France by Nazi Germany in 1940. Following the end of the war, the French Fourth Republic was constituted along similar lines in 1946. The Fourth Republic saw an era of great economic growth in France and the rebuilding of the nation's social institutions and industry after the war, and played an important part in the development of the process of European integration, which changed the continent permanently. Some attempts were made to strengthen the executive branch of government to prevent the unstable situation that had existed before the war, but the instability remained and the Fourth Republic saw frequent changes in government – there were 20 governments in ten years. Additionally, the government proved unable to make effective decisions regarding decolonization. As a result, the Fourth Republic collapsed and Charles de Gaulle was given power to rule by decree, subsequently legitimized by approval of a new constitution in a referendum on 28 September 1958 that led to the establishment of the French Fifth Republic in 1959.

Chile became the first parliamentary republic in South America following a civil war in 1891. However, following a coup in 1925 this system was replaced by a presidential one.

Commonwealth of Nations 

Since the London Declaration of 29 April 1949 (just weeks after Ireland declared itself a republic, and excluded itself from the Commonwealth) republics have been admitted as members of the Commonwealth of Nations.

In the case of many republics in the Commonwealth of Nations, it was common for the Sovereign, formerly represented by a Governor-General, to be replaced by a non-executive head of state. This was the case in South Africa (which ceased to be a member of the Commonwealth immediately upon becoming a republic, and later switched to having an executive presidency), Malta, Trinidad and Tobago, India, Vanuatu, and most recently Barbados. In many of these examples, the last Governor-General became the first president. Such was the case with Sri Lanka and Pakistan.

Other states became parliamentary republics upon gaining independence.

List of modern parliamentary republics and related systems

List of former parliamentary republics and related systems

See also 
List of countries by system of government
Constitutional monarchy
Parliamentary system
Republic
Republicanism
Semi-presidential system
Semi-parliamentary system

Notes

References 

Parliamentary procedure
Liberalism
Political terminology
Republic
Types of democracy

de:Parlamentarisches Regierungssystem#Parlamentarische Republik